Mirko Eichhorn (born 30 August 1971) is a former German figure skater. He won two national titles, East German in 1989 and German in 1992. He competed at four World Championships and four European Championships. His best result was seventh at the 1991 European Championships.

Competitive highlights

References

 German wiki article

1971 births
Living people
German male single skaters
Figure skaters from Berlin